John Banks Hollingworth  was Archdeacon of Huntingdon from 25 February 1828 until his death on 9 February 1856.
 
Hollingworth was born in 1780, educated at Peterhouse, Cambridge and ordained in 1804. He held incumbencies at Little St Mary's, Cambridge and St Margaret Lothbury; and was Norrisian Professor of Divinity from 1824 to 1838.

References

1803 births
Alumni of Peterhouse, Cambridge
Norrisian Professors of Divinity
Archdeacons of Huntingdon
1856 deaths